Goody's 500 or Goody's Headache Powder 500 may refer to several different NASCAR races:

 For the spring race at Martinsville Speedway from 1996 to 2000 and from 2007 to the present, see Blue-Emu Maximum Pain Relief 500
 For the fall race at Martinsville Speedway from 1983 to 1995, see Xfinity 500
 For the race at Bristol Motor Speedway from 1994 to 1999, see Bass Pro Shops NRA Night Race